The Bellamy salute is a palm-out salute created by James B. Upham as the gesture that was to accompany the American Pledge of Allegiance, whose text had been written by Francis Bellamy. It was also known as the "flag salute" during the period when it was used with the Pledge of Allegiance. Bellamy promoted the salute and it came to be associated with his name. Both the Pledge and its salute originated in 1892. Later, during the 1920s and 1930s, Italian fascists and Nazi Germans adopted a salute which was very similar, attributed to the Roman salute, a gesture that was popularly believed to have been used in ancient Rome. This resulted in controversy over the use of the Bellamy salute in the United States. It was officially replaced by the hand-over-heart salute when Congress amended the Flag Code on December 22, 1942.

History

The inventor of the Bellamy salute was James B. Upham, junior partner and editor of The Youth's Companion. Bellamy recalled that Upham, upon reading the pledge, came into the posture of the salute, snapped his heels together, and said, "Now up there is the flag; I come to salute; as I say "I pledge allegiance to my flag," I stretch out my right hand and keep it raised while I say the stirring words that follow."

The Bellamy salute was first demonstrated on October 12, 1892, according to Bellamy's published instructions for the "National School Celebration of Columbus Day":

In the 1920s, Italian fascists adopted what has been called the Roman salute to symbolize their claim to have revitalized Italy on the model of ancient Rome. A similar ritual was adopted by the German Nazis, creating the Nazi salute. Controversy grew in the United States on the use of the Bellamy salute given its similarity to the fascist salutes. School boards around the country revised the salute to avoid this similarity. There was a counter-backlash from the United States Flag Association and the Daughters of the American Revolution, who felt it inappropriate for Americans to have to change the traditional salute because foreigners had later adopted a similar gesture.

From 1939 until the attack on Pearl Harbor, critics of Americans who argued against intervention in World War II produced propaganda using the salute to lessen those Americans' reputations. Among the anti-interventionist Americans was aviation pioneer Charles Lindbergh. The pictures of him appearing to do the Nazi salute are actually pictures of him using the Bellamy salute. In his Pulitzer Prize-winning biography Lindbergh (1998), author A. Scott Berg explains that interventionist propagandists would photograph Lindbergh and other isolationists using this salute from an angle that left out the American flag, so it would be indistinguishable to observers from the Nazi salute.

On June 22, 1942, at the urging of the American Legion and the Veterans of Foreign Wars, Congress passed Public Law 77-623, which codified the etiquette used to display and pledge allegiance to the flag. This included the use of a palm-out salute, specifically that the pledge "be rendered by standing with the right hand over the heart; extending the right hand, palm upward, toward the flag at the words 'to the flag' and holding this position until the end, when the hand drops to the side." Congress did not discuss or take into account the controversy over use of the salute. Congress later amended the code on December 22, 1942, when it passed Public Law 77-829, stating among other changes, that the pledge "be rendered by standing with the right hand over the heart."

See also
 Ave
 Ave Imperator, morituri te salutant
 Bras d'honneur
 Heil og sæl
 Nazi salute
 Oath of the Horatii
 
 Quenelle (gesture)
 Raised fist
 Roman salute
 Zogist salute

References

Further reading

External links

United States Department of Veteran Affairs
History of discontinuation of the Bellamy salute, Glenn Kessler

Bellamyism
Pledge of Allegiance
Hand gestures
Gestures of respect
Salutes